The Get Down is an American musical drama television series created by Baz Luhrmann and Stephen Adly Guirgis. The series debuted on Netflix on August 12, 2016, and was cancelled after the first season.

Produced by Sony Pictures Television, the series is set in the South Bronx region of New York City in the late 1970s; its title refers to parts of disco and R&B records that could be repeated using multiple turntables and were enjoyed most by dancers. A five-episode second part concluding the series was released on April 7, 2017. On May 24, 2017, Netflix announced that the series had concluded after part two and that there would be no more seasons.

Premise
The series is set in the 1970s in the Bronx borough of New York City and follows the rise of hip-hop and disco music through the eyes of a group of teenagers. Each episode begins with MC Books, a famous artist who raps his story to a large crowd during a concert in 1996. The short rap serves as both a recap of previous episodes and a setup of the coming events. Each episode is intercut with real footage and newscasts from the 1970s.

Part one begins in 1977 with Zeke (young MC Books), a young poet who lives with his aunt Wanda following the death of his parents. He proceeds to meet Shaolin Fantastic, a graffiti artist and aspiring DJ. The two band together with Zeke's friends to become "The Get Down Brothers," with a dream to become successful music artists and take over the city. Mylene, Zeke's long-time love, dreams of becoming a disco singer and leaving the Bronx but faces obstacles such as her father, a pastor who disapproves of secular music. The show depicts various gangs and gangsters in the area, specifically Fat Annie and her son Cadillac, and observes the poverty and violence faced by those living in the Bronx in the 1970s.

Part two is set in 1978 and sees the group members entering adulthood and their futures in the music industry. Zeke is faced with an ultimatum: love or music. Although Mylene is his first love, music is his love as well. Mylene is moving up in the music industry and wants Zeke to be there with her, but doesn't think he is putting in the effort. Shaolin and the gang focus on making music and making money. Shaolin gets a car with a dead body in the trunk, which shakes the boys and makes them second-guess their relationship with him. Shaolin calms them down, explaining that everything is going to be all right. They calm down but remain worried about Cadillac and his business with Shaolin.

Cast

Main
Justice Smith as Ezekiel ("Zeke") "Books" Figuero: A smart, resourceful teen, brimming with untapped talent and unrequited love, determined to make his mark in the world. He is in love with Mylene, but her desire to leave the Bronx hinders their relationship.
Shameik Moore as Curtis "Shaolin Fantastic", or "Shao": A child of the streets; thrill-seeking, unpredictable, and eccentric but above all, enigmatic. He is distrustful of Mylene and sees her as a distraction to Zeke.
Herizen F. Guardiola as Mylene Cruz: A tenacious girl with an incredible voice who dreams of becoming a disco star, a dream that is far outside the realm of her fiercely religious background. She loves Zeke, but fears that he won't ever leave the Bronx.
Skylan Brooks as Ronald "Ra-Ra" Kipling: A loyal, respected, and protective friend and brother with his head screwed on tight; he's the voice of reason beyond his years.
Tremaine Brown Jr. as Miles "Boo-Boo" Kipling: A mechanically-minded kid who is an irrepressible 40 year-old in a 14 year-old's body.
Yahya Abdul-Mateen II as Clarence "Cadillac" Caldwell: A "fly gangster," prince of the disco world, and son of the owner of the most notorious after-hours nightspot in the Bronx.
Jimmy Smits as Francisco "Papa Fuerte" Cruz: A South Bronx political boss who delivers services to his constituents that the city has failed to provide, such as jobs, housing, and healthcare.

Recurring

Jaden Smith as Marcus "Dizzee" Kipling: The most artistically minded of the Kipling brothers, Dizzee is a graffiti artist who tags as Rumi 411.
Daveed Diggs as adult Ezekiel "Mr. Books" Figuero: The rap-narrator of the series. His rapping voice is dubbed by hip-hop artist Nas.
Giancarlo Esposito as Pastor Ramon Cruz: Papa Fuerte's brother and Mylene's father. The charismatic head of the local Pentecostal church who attracts a flock of followers with his fiery sermons and firm, steady leadership.
Stefanée Martin as Yolanda Kipling: The sister of Boo-Boo, Dizzee, and Ra-Ra. One of Mylene's best friends and a member of the Soul Madonnas.
Shyrley Rodriguez as Regina: Another one of Mylene's best friends and a member of the Soul Madonnas. Outrageous and rebellious, she is in an abusive relationship with Little Wolf.
Mamoudou Athie as Grandmaster Flash: A hip-hop recording artist and DJ. In real life, he is considered to be one of the pioneers of hip-hop DJing, cutting, and mixing. In this TV series, he serves as a mentor to Shaolin Fantastic as well as the rest of the Get Down Brothers.
Karen Aldridge as Adele Kipling: The mother of Yolanda, Boo-Boo, Dizzee, and Ra-Ra.
Kevin Corrigan as Jackie Moreno: A record producer. In the past, Moreno produced many hit records but years of hard drug abuse and alienating others in the record industry have stalled his career.
Brandon J. Dirden as Leon: Wanda's boyfriend.
Michel Gill as Herbert Gunns: A New York City Council member, businessman, and supporter of then-Congressman Edward Koch.
Zabryna Guevara as Lydia Cruz: The wife of Pastor Ramon Cruz and the mother of Mylene.
Ron Cephas Jones as Winston Kipling: The father of Yolanda, Boo-Boo, Dizzee, and Ra-Ra.
Judy Marte as Wanda: Ezekiel's aunt.
Evan Parke as Wolf.
Salma Salinas as Angela Cruz: Daughter of Pastor Ramon Cruz and Lydia Cruz and sister of Mylene.
Sal Rendino as Stanley Kelly.
Yolonda Ross as Ms. Green: The caring-but-tough English teacher who nurtures the potential in her students and advocates for them to pursue their talents.
Tory Devon Smith as Little Wolf: Regina's abusive boyfriend and one of the neighborhood's drug dealers.
Lillias White as Fat Annie: Owner of the notorious Les Inferno club, mother of Cadillac, and boss of the local crime family. She is a sexual predator and is known to be sexually abusive, specifically toward Shaolin. In part two, it is revealed by Shaolin that she sexually abused her son, Cadillac, as well.
Frank Wood as Ed Koch: A real life U.S. Congressman from New York's 18th district and Democratic candidate for mayor of New York in 1977. Koch has a tough stance against crime (particularly graffiti) and wants to restore public safety back to New York City, so he reluctantly allies himself with Papa Fuerte to help in his campaign in the Bronx.
Lee Tergesen as Inspector Moran: A police inspector who is on Fat Annie's payroll. He is responsible for Boo-Boo's arrest at the end of part two. He is nicknamed "Moach" by Cadillac.
Eric Bogosian as Roy Asheton: Record executive and president of Marrakech Star, a disco label, responsible for the success of Donna Summer and Misty Holloway.
Eric D. Hill Jr. as DJ Kool Herc: Real life DJ who is credited with originating hip-hop music in the early 1970s in the Bronx. He serves as a mentor for the Notorious Three (The Herculoids).
Noah Le Gros as Thor: A graffiti artist who lives a free lifestyle, and Dizzee's love interest.
Qaasim Middleton as DJ Big Planet: Member of the Notorious Three (the Herculoids), the mortal enemies of the Get Down Brothers.
RayJonaldy Rodriguez as Silent Carlito: Another member of the Notorious Three (the Herculoids).
Khalil Middleton as MC Luke Skywalker Cage: Another member of the Notorious Three (the Herculoids).
Julia Garner as Claudia Gunns: Daughter of Herbert Gunns.
Barrington Walters Jr. as Doo-Wop: Street-hardened, roughneck drug dealer.
Jeremie Harris as Shane Vincent: Mylene Cruz's manager.
Okieriete Onaodowan as Afrika Bambaataa: Real life hip-hop DJ and recording artist, and founder of the Universal Zulu Nation.
Jamie Jackson as Robert Stigwood: Real-life Australian-born, British-resident music entrepreneur, film producer and impresario. Best known for managing Cream and the Bee Gees, theatrical productions like Hair and Jesus Christ Superstar, and film productions including the extremely successful Grease and Saturday Night Fever.

Guest
Billy Porter as DJ Malibu: A DJ at Les Inferno.
Annika Boras as Mrs. Gunns.
Alexis Krause as Leslie Lesgold: Highly influential creator of a weekly "record pool" that selects the hottest disco records to be played by New York club DJs.
Renée Elise Goldsberry as Misty Holloway: A popular disco singer who is idolized by Mylene.
Bryce Pinkham as Julien.
Imani Lewis as Tanya.

Episodes

Production
The series was announced in February 2015, after Luhrmann had spent over ten years developing the concept. The series is described as "a mythic saga of how New York at the brink of bankruptcy gave birth to hip-hop, punk and disco." The Sony Pictures Television show takes place in Bronx tenements, the SoHo art scene, CBGB, Studio 54 and the just-built World Trade Center. On April 9, 2015, it was announced that Justice Smith, Shameik Moore, Skylan Brooks, Jaden Smith, and newcomer Tremaine (TJ) Brown Jr. would play the show's lead male roles. On April 16, 2015, it was announced that newcomer Herizen F. Guardiola would play the show's female lead.

Rap legends Grandmaster Flash, Kurtis Blow, and Nas hosted a hip-hop boot camp to educate the young actors. The production crew used the Eisner Award-winning comic series Hip Hop Family Tree by Ed Piskor as a reference point. The Sony-produced series soon hit delays and also saw the departure of original show-runner Shawn Ryan. The first six episodes of season one debuted in August 2016, marking the first time a Netflix original season was split into two parts rather than released all at once — as has been the tradition at the streamer for scripted series. The trailer for part two was released in February 2017, with episodes being made available on Netflix on April 7, 2017. The series picked up a year later, set in 1978. The accompanying soundtrack was released on April 21, 2017. The last five episodes brought the season one episode count to 11 — two short of the original 13-episode order The Get Down received in 2015. The Get Down was Netflix's most expensive series up to date, costing around 120 million. The expense of 120 million greatly surpassed the budget of 7.5 million.

Reception
Praise for the show primarily centred around strong music, a fresh cast, and a nod to authenticity with Luhrmann specifically involving many historical characters in producer roles, including: Nas, Grandmaster Flash, Kurtis Blow, and DJ Kool Herc. Part one holds a score of 77% on Rotten Tomatoes, based on 79 reviews, with the critic consensus reading, "The Get Down's vibrant music and energetic young cast help to elevate its meandering narrative." The season has an overall score of 69 out of 100 based on 31 reviews on Metacritic which is classified as "generally favourable reviews." Part two received an 86% rating on Rotten Tomatoes, based on 14 critics, with an average score of 7.68 out of 10, with the critic consensus reading, "The Get Down continues to be a dazzling kaleidoscope of genre styles and a warm celebration of hip-hop's origins."

The uptempo musical numbers and soundtrack were generally praised as well as the performances from the main cast and cinematography of the show. However, the overly dramatic love story and sometimes "cartoonish" violence have been criticized, saying it detracts from the darker, authentic feel of the show and its setting. Reviews improved with later episodes as critics felt that the series had toned down its more outlandish and over the top elements in favour of a more cohesive and balanced episode structure. Matt Zoller Seitz of Vulture gave high praises to the series' second half, stating that, "A promising show has become a terrific one." Seitz later named The Get Down as the 4th best TV series of 2017, writing that it is "one of a handful of series that can be said to have devised its own language." Variety ultimately praised the show as, "a reclamation of, and a love letter to, a marginalized community of a certain era, told through the unreliable tools of romance, intuition, and lived experiences."

Accolades

See also
Music of The Get Down

References

External links
The Get Down on Netflix

2016 American television series debuts
2017 American television series endings
2010s American teen drama television series
2010s American music television series
Hip hop television
English-language Netflix original programming
Serial drama television series
Television series by Sony Pictures Television
Television series set in the 1970s
Television shows filmed in New York (state)
Television shows set in New York City
Television series set in 1977
Television series set in 1978
2010s American black television series